The Macdonald conjecture could be one of several conjectures due to :

Macdonald's conjectures about Macdonald polynomials,
Macdonald's generalization of the Dyson conjecture,
Macdonald's generalization of the Mehta integral.

References